Great Diamond Mystery is a 1924 American silent mystery film directed by Denison Clift and starring Shirley Mason, Jackie Saunders, and Harry von Meter.

Plot
As described in a review in a contemporary film magazine:

Cast

Preservation
With no prints of Great Diamond Mystery located in any film archives, it is a lost film.

References

Bibliography
 Solomon, Aubrey. The Fox Film Corporation, 1915-1935. A History and Filmography. McFarland & Co, 2011.

External links

1924 films
Films directed by Denison Clift
American silent feature films
Fox Film films
American black-and-white films
American mystery films
1920s English-language films
1920s American films
Silent mystery films